Karrie Martin (born March 3, 1989) is an American actress and entrepreneur best known for her role as Ana Morales on the Netflix series Gentefied. Martin grew up in a Honduran-American family and did not speak English until she started school. She attended Louisiana State University for college, where she was in Phi Mu sorority. Prior to acting, she worked in casting.

Filmography

References

External links
 

1989 births
Living people
American people of Honduran descent